Lamprosema commixta is a moth in the family Crambidae. It was described by Arthur Gardiner Butler in 1873. It is found in Japan, Korea, Taiwan, China, Cambodia, Vietnam, Nepal, India and Sri Lanka.

The wingspan is about 17 mm. The ground colour of the forewings and hindwings is yellowish brown with a black postmedial line.

References

Moths described in 1873
Lamprosema
Moths of Asia